William Seward Burroughs may refer to:

William Seward Burroughs I (1857–1898), inventor of adding machine
William S. Burroughs (1914–1997), author and grandson of the above
William S. Burroughs Jr. (1947–1981), author and son of the above

de:William Seward Burroughs